A pseudoallergy is a condition named for its similar presentation to a true allergy, though due to different causes.

It may be due to alterations in the metabolism of histamine.

It can be the cause of some forms of food intolerance.

References

Allergology